Monogamus is a genus of small sea snails, marine gastropod mollusks in the family Eulimidae.

Species
 Monogamus barroni (A. Adams, 1854)
 Monogamus entopodia Lützen, 1976
 Monogamus interspinea Lützen, 1976
 Monogamus minibulla (Olsson & McGinty, 1958)
 Monogamus parasaleniae Warén, 1980

References

 Warén A. (1980) Descriptions of new taxa of Eulimidae (Mollusca, Prosobranchia), with notes on some previously described genera. Zoologica Scripta 9: 283-306

External links
 To World Register of Marine Species

Eulimidae